The Nottingham Building Society is a building society founded in 1849 by a group led by Samuel Fox (1781–1868), a Quaker and prominent local grocer.

The purpose of the society was to promote the construction of a better class of dwellings, suitable for the working and middle classes, as well as provide a safe and profitable place for small savings.

The Nottingham Building Society was one of the first financial institutions to introduce online banking in 1983, with its 'Homelink' service on Prestel. It is a member of the Building Societies Association.

Branches
The society currently has 31 branches across 9 counties including in city centre on Parliament Street, Beeston, Bulwell, Mapperley, on Mansfield Road, and Wollaton. It has many of its branches in the county of Nottinghamshire, Leicestershire , Hertfordshire and others in Lincolnshire, Derbyshire and Sheffield.

In 1970 it acquired the Grantham Building Society and has taken on branches destined for closure from Santander, The Co-operative Bank, Derbyshire Building Society, Shepshed Building Society and Yorkshire Building Society. In July 2017, the Nottingham Building Society added to its branch network by acquiring seven locations from the Norwich and Peterborough Building Society.

Notes

References

External links
Nottingham Building Society
KPMG Building Societies Database 2008
Thames Television 'Database' Show - Homelink System Segment (1983)

Building societies of England
Banks established in 1849
Organizations established in 1849
Companies based in Nottingham
1849 establishments in England